Salem School is a historic Rosenwald School building located near Red Oak, Charlotte County, Virginia. It was built in 1923–1924, and is a one-story, three-bay frame rectangular structure with weatherboard siding.  It stands on a brick pier foundation.  The school operated until 1959 when it was closed due to desegregation of the Charlotte County school system.

It was listed on the National Register of Historic Places in 1998.

References

Rosenwald schools in Virginia
School buildings on the National Register of Historic Places in Virginia
School buildings completed in 1924
Schools in Charlotte County, Virginia
National Register of Historic Places in Charlotte County, Virginia
1924 establishments in Virginia